The first elections to the Highland Council were held on 6 April 1995; the same day as elections to the 31 other new councils in Scotland. 72 councillors were elected from 72 wards using the plurality system (a.k.a. 'First Past the Post'). Independent councillors retained their status as the majority group, with councillors also being elected representing the Conservative Party, Labour Party, Liberal Democrats, and Scottish National Party. The newly elected council existed in 'shadow' form until it assumed its full powers on 1 April 1996.

Overall result

Ward results

Caithness

Sutherland

Skye and Lochalsh

Ross and Cromarty

Inverness

Nairn

Badenoch and Strathspey

Lochaber

References

1995
1995 Scottish local elections